This is a timeline of women's suffrage in Alabama. Women's suffrage in Alabama starts in the late 1860s and grows over time in the 1890s. Much of the women's suffrage work stopped after 1901, only to pick up again in 1910. Alabama did not ratify the Nineteenth Amendment until 1953 and African-Americans and women were affected by poll taxes and other issues until the mid 1960s.

19th century

1860s 
1867

 Pierce Burton writes an article supporting women's right to vote in Alabama.
1868

 Priscilla Holmes Drake is the only representative from Alabama to the National Woman Suffrage Association (NWSA).

1890s 
1892

 Women's suffrage groups formed in New Decatur and Verbena.

1893

 The Alabama Woman Suffrage Organization is founded.
1894

 The Huntsville League for Woman Suffrage is created.

1895

 Susan B. Anthony and Carrie Chapman Catt speak in Alabama.

20th century

1900s 
1900

 October 1: State suffrage convention held in Huntsville.

1901

 Emera Frances Griffin speaks out in favor of women's suffrage at the state constitutional convention.

1910s 
1910

 March 29: Selma Suffrage League is formed.

1911

 October 22: The Equal Suffrage League of Birmingham is formed.
1912

 October 9: The Alabama Equal Suffrage Association (AESA) is formed in Birmingham.
AESA headquarters are set up in Birmingham.
The Huntsville Equal Suffrage Association is created.

1913

 AESA holds their first state convention in Selma at Hotel Albert and Pattie Ruffner Jacobs is elected president of the group.
March 3: Delegates from Alabama march in the Woman Suffrage Procession.
June: AESA sends representatives to the International Suffrage Alliance in Budapest.
July: Suffrage association formed in Tuscaloosa, Alabama.
December: Representatives from AESA attend the forty-fourth annual NAWSA convention. Pattie Ruffner Jacobs speaks at the convention.
1914

 February 5: AESA holds their state convention in Huntsville. Representatives from Birmingham, Coal City, Cullman, Greensboro, Hunstville, Mobile, Montgomery, Pell City, Selma, Tuscaloosa, and Vinemont were all in attendance.
September: Suffragists host a women's suffrage booth at the Alabama State Fair.

1915

 AESA holds their state convention in Tuscaloosa.
AESA's headquarters are moved to Selma.
August 25: A suffrage bill is brought to the state legislature, but does not receive enough votes to pass.
October: AESA starts to publish the Alabama Suffrage Bulletin.

1916

 Alabama Association Opposed to Woman Suffrage (AAOWS) was formed.
February 9: AESA holds its state convention in Gadsden.
1917

 February 12–13: AESA holds the state convention in Birmingham. Around 81 suffrage clubs report to the convention. A suffrage school is held afterwards with around 200 students.
1918

 May 7–8: AESA holds its state convention in Selma.

1919

 The Alabama Woman's Anti-Ratification League (AWARL) is formed.
September 22: Alabama rejects the Nineteenth Amendment.

1950s 
1953

 September 8: Alabama ratifies the Nineteenth Amendment.

1960s 
1964

 January 23: Poll taxes are abolished through the Twenty-Fourth Amendment.
1965

 The Voting Rights Act of 1965 provides African-American women full access to the right to vote.

See also 

 List of Alabama suffragists
 Women's suffrage in Alabama
 Women's suffrage in states of the United States
 Women's suffrage in the United States

References

Sources 

 

Alabama suffrage
Politics of Alabama
Timelines of states of the United States
Suffrage referendums
American suffragists
History of women's rights in the United States
History of women in Alabama